The 1997 Sybase Open was a men's tennis tournament played on indoor hard courts at the San Jose Arena in San Jose, California in the United States and was part of the ATP World Series of the 1997 ATP Tour. It was the 109th edition of the tournament ran from February 10 through February 16, 1997. First-seeded Pete Sampras won his second consecutive singles title at the event.

Finals

Singles

 Pete Sampras defeated  Greg Rusedski 3–6, 5–0 (Rusedski retired)
 It was Sampras' 2nd title of the year and the 48th of his career.

Doubles

 Brian MacPhie /  Gary Muller defeated  Mark Knowles /  Daniel Nestor 4–6, 7–6, 7–5
 It was MacPhie's only title of the year and the 1st of his career. It was Muller's only title of the year and the 8th of his career.

References

External links
 ITF tournament edition details

Sybase Open
SAP Open
Sybase Open
Sybase Open
Sybase Open